The Solingen Alligators are a German baseball and softball club from Solingen, North Rhine-Westphalia.  The club was founded in 1991 and the first men's team was promoted to the first division of the Baseball Bundesliga for the 2003 season. It has played there in every season since, winning the league championship in 2006 and 2014. The club claims over 250 members.

Club structure
The full club consists of 9 teams:
1st Men's Baseball, Bundesliga's 1st Division
2nd Men's Baseball, Bundesliga's 2nd Division
3rd Men's Baseball, Bezirksliga
Juniors
Youth 1
Youth 2
Adult Pitch
Tee Ball
Hobby Team

Season by Season Performance (1st Bundesliga)

References

External links
 Official Site
 Baseballpark Weyersberg

Baseball teams in Germany